Poul Hansen (born 4 December 1953) is a Danish football manager, formerly director of sports at Odense Boldklub. He was awarded Danish Football Manager of the Year in 1999.

He has been the manager of Haderslev FK, Ikast fS, Lyngby FC, and AGF Aarhus. From 2002 to 2003 he was director of sports of Farum BK.

He has since 2008 been expert commentator at TV2 Sport.

References

1953 births
Living people
Danish football managers
SønderjyskE Fodbold managers
Ikast FS managers
Lyngby Boldklub managers
Aarhus Gymnastikforening managers
Odense Boldklub managers
Danish Superliga managers
Danish 1st Division managers